Wainwright, Ohio may refer to:

 Wainwright, Jackson County, Ohio
 Wainwright, Tuscarawas County, Ohio